Ramirez "Remy" Longdon (nee Howarth; born 14 September 1997) is an English professional footballer who plays as a midfielder.

Career
Howarth began his career with Blackburn Rovers (between the ages of 12 and 19), spending loan spells at Bamber Bridge and Skelmersdale United before signing permanently for Skelmersdale United in August 2017. During his early career he suffered a back injury and was out-of-action for 18 months. He later played for Ashton United, West Didsbury & Chorlton  and Cefn Druids, before signing with Lincoln City in September 2020. He made his debut for Lincoln the next day, coming off the bench in the first round of the EFL Cup. He would make his league debut coming off the bench against Bristol Rovers on 10 October 2020. He scored his first goal for Lincoln in an EFL Trophy tie against Shrewsbury Town on 8 December 2020. He signed a contract extension on 25 February 2021, keeping him at the club until the summer of 2022. On 16 December he joined York City on a short-term loan until the end of January 2022. On 21 January 2022, his loan was turned permanent. Longdon suffered health problems shortly afterwards, and was released at the end of the season.

Personal life
He changed his surname from Howarth to Longdon in 2021.

Career statistics

References

1997 births
Living people
English footballers
Association football midfielders
Blackburn Rovers F.C. players
Bamber Bridge F.C. players
Skelmersdale United F.C. players
Ashton United F.C. players
West Didsbury & Chorlton A.F.C. players
Cefn Druids A.F.C. players
Lincoln City F.C. players
York City F.C. players
National League (English football) players
Cymru Premier players
English Football League players